A Rugby card is a type of trading card relating to rugby football codes, usually printed on cardboard, silk, or plastic. These cards are most often found in the Australia, New Zealand and other countries where the sport is popular.

History
Early versions of rugby union trading cards came at the beginning of 20th century, when tobacco companies released their cigarette card series. The first collections consisted on black and white photographs of rugby players, such examples of this were series issued by Ogden and W.D. & H.O. Wills (both in 1902) and Taddy (1906). Later collections featured color illustrations of player portraits (Ogden, 1906) and live actions (issued by Gallagher in 1912).

In successive decades, other tobacco manufacturers launched series. In 1926, Ogden released a new black and white series of players. The same year, John Player & Sons released a series that consisted of caricatures of rugby players. In 1935, W.A. & A.C. Churchman released an illustrated series displaying player portraits.

Australian company Scanlens produced its first rugby league set in 1963, releasing several collections during the 1970s and 1980s. Other companies that produced cards were Stimorol (1988–91) and Regina (1992–93), until Dynamic Market took over the contract to produce rugby league cards in Australia.

Another Australian company, "Select Australia", entered into the business in 2000. The company was the official licensee for National Rugby League (NRL) cards (2010–12). Since then, the NRL licensed company "Elite Sport Properties" (ESP) to produce trading cards. The NRL also released its own collections, Startoons, featuring caricatures of players.

Collections 
Some rugby union/rugby league card collections released through the years include:

Notes

References

External links

 NRL cards checklist on Select Australia
 Rugby league cards on Dan's NRL Collectibles
 Rugby Relics, collectors website
 Starr Cards, custom rugby cards
 Matheson Sports

Trading cards
Rugby football culture
Sports memorabilia
National Rugby League
Super Rugby